Pseudocolynthaea pectoralis is a species of beetle in the family Cerambycidae.  It is the only species in the genus Pseudocolynthaea.

References

Piezocerini
Monotypic beetle genera